Virginia M. Miller is an American comparative physiologist who is a professor emerita and former Director of the Women's Health Research Center at the Mayo Clinic. Her research considered how sex hormones such as estrogen impact cardiovascular health.

Early life and education 
Miller earned her bachelor's degree in education at Slippery Rock University of Pennsylvania. She earned a Master of Business Administration at the University of Minnesota. She moved to the University of Missouri for graduate studies, where she specialized in physiology.

Research and career 
Miller dedicated her career to better understanding women's health. Miller studied sex hormones and their role in cardiovascular health. She served as Principal Investigator of the Mayo Clinic Building Interdisciplinary Careers in Women’s Health scholar's program.

Awards and honors 
 Bernadine Healy Award for Visionary Leadership in Women’s Health
 Women’s Day Magazine Red Dress Award
 Paul M. Vanhoutte Named Lecture in Vascular Pharmacology from the American Society for Pharmacology and Experimental Therapeutics
 Governing council for the American Physiological Society
 President of the Organization for the Study of Sex Differences

Selected publications

References 

American surgeons
Slippery Rock University of Pennsylvania alumni
University of Minnesota alumni
University of Missouri alumni
Mayo Clinic people
Year of birth missing (living people)
Living people